Literary movements
Chinese literary schools and movements
1980s establishments in China
The xúngēn movement is a cultural and literary movement in mainland China emphasizing local and minority cultures. It began in 1980s. Its premise is that the Cultural Revolution damaged a pluralistic Chinese identity and traditions that had existed for centuries, and that the reconstruction of that identity requires a healthy appreciation of local cultures. Furthermore, the century of modernization and cultural and political iconoclasm had only severed Chinese traditions. Some of the key writers are Han Shaogong (韓少功), Mo Yan, Ah Cheng (阿城), and Jia Pingwa (賈平凹).